Sigrid Christina Lindblom-Scherling (born 28 June 1940) is a retired Swedish speed skater. She competed in 500–3000 m events at the 1960, 1964 and 1968 Winter Olympics and finished in 5–15th place.

References

External links 
 

1940 births
Living people
Olympic speed skaters of Sweden
Speed skaters at the 1960 Winter Olympics
Speed skaters at the 1964 Winter Olympics
Speed skaters at the 1968 Winter Olympics
Swedish female speed skaters
People from Borlänge Municipality
Sportspeople from Dalarna County